New Rochester, Ohio may refer to:
New Rochester, Paulding County, Ohio, an unincorporated community in Paulding County
New Rochester, Wood County, Ohio, an unincorporated community in Wood County